The discography of Canadian rapper and singer Drake consists of seven studio albums, three compilation albums, four extended plays, seven mixtapes, 140 singles (including 81 as a featured artist), five promotional singles and 84 music videos. His music has been released on record labels Universal Motown Records and Republic Records, along with subsidiaries Young Money Entertainment, Cash Money Records and OVO Sound. With 170 million records sold worldwide, he is among the best-selling music artists in history. Drake has achieved eleven number-one albums on the Billboard 200 and twelve number-one hits on the Billboard Hot 100. Billboard hailed him as the "Artist of the 2010s Decade" and the 16th Greatest Artist of all time. RIAA ranks him as the 2nd top-selling digital artist of all time with 164 million in the United States. He has the most number one singles on the US Hot Rap Songs chart with twenty-five, and the most number one singles on the US Hot R&B/Hip-Hop Songs chart with twenty-five.

Following him signing to Young Money Entertainment imprint, Drake's mixtape, So Far Gone was repackaged as a 2009 release of his seven-song extended play. The EP peaked at number 6 on the US Billboard 200, and later became certified gold by the Recording Industry Association of America (RIAA). So Far Gone contains three singles: "Best I Ever Had", "Successful", and "I'm Goin' In". These singles peaked at numbers 2, 17, and 40 on the US Billboard Hot 100, respectively. In June 2010, Drake released his debut studio album, Thank Me Later. It debuted atop both the Billboard 200 and the Canadian Albums Chart, and later became certified platinum by both the Recording Industry Association of America (RIAA) and Canadian Recording Industry Association (CRIA). Thank Me Later featured the single, "Find Your Love", peaking it at number 5 on the US Billboard Hot 100.

In November 2011, Drake released his second studio album, Take Care, which debuted at number one in both the United States and Canada, becoming his second album to achieve this feat. The album produced the singles such as "Marvins Room", "Headlines", "Make Me Proud", "The Motto", "Take Care", "HYFR (Hell Ya Fucking Right)", "Crew Love", and "Lord Knows", four of which reached the top 15 of the Billboard Hot 100 and were certified platinum by the RIAA (RIAA). "Take Care" became the most commercially successful single from the album in many overseas territories such as Australia, where it was certified double platinum by the Australian Recording Industry Association (ARIA), Ireland and the United Kingdom. In September 2013, Drake released his third studio album, Nothing Was the Same, becoming his third consecutive number-one album in Canada and the US and produced two of his top 10 singles "Started from the Bottom" and "Hold On, We're Going Home".

In 2015, Drake released two mixtapes, If You're Reading This It's Too Late which became available for purchase in February and a surprise joint mixtape with Future, What a Time to Be Alive, which was released in September. Drake's fourth studio album Views was released in April 2016, once again debuting at number one in both the United States and Canada, while also debuting at number one in the United Kingdom where it became his first number one album. The album achieved huge commercial success, becoming the most popular release of 2016 in the US. The album included the singles "Hotline Bling", "One Dance", "Pop Style", "Controlla", and "Too Good", all of which peaked within the top 20 on the Billboard Hot 100 chart. "One Dance" became the most successful single of Drake's career, becoming an international hit and peaking at number one in fifteen countries, including Canada, the US, and the UK, where it became his first number-one single. "One Dance" has since also become the third most played song on streaming media service Spotify, with over two billion individual streams.

Drake's fifth studio album, Scorpion, was released in June 2018 and again debuted at number one in Canada and in the US. The album was certified platinum on the day it was released and became the first album to be streamed over one billion times in its release week. It sold 732,000 album-equivalent units, which included 160,000 pure album sales, making it the biggest first week of the year at the time. All 25 tracks on the album entered the Billboard Hot 100. The album was supported by six singles, including the number-one singles "God's Plan", "Nice for What", and "In My Feelings". In August 2018, Drake was featured on Travis Scott's single, "Sicko Mode", which reached number one on the Hot 100 four months later, but he was not credited as a featured artist. In August 2019, Drake released a compilation album titled Care Package. He released his seventh mixtape Dark Lane Demo Tapes, in May 2020, which spawned his seventh Hot 100 number-one single, "Toosie Slide". In March 2021, he released the extended play Scary Hours 2, which included his eighth Hot 100 chart-topper, "What's Next". In September 2021, Drake released his sixth studio album, Certified Lover Boy, in which he got his ninth number-one single on the Hot 100 with "Way 2 Sexy", which features Future and Young Thug. In May 2022, he was featured alongside Tems on Future's single, "Wait for U", which became his tenth number-one single. In June 2022, Drake released his seventh studio album, Honestly, Nevermind, from which he achieved his eleventh number-one single on the Hot 100 with "Jimmy Cooks", which features 21 Savage. In November 2022, Drake released a collaborative studio album with 21 Savage, Her Loss.

Albums

Studio albums

Collaborative albums

Compilation albums

Mixtapes

Extended plays

Singles

As lead artist

As featured artist

Promotional singles

Other charted and certified songs

Guest appearances

Songwriting discography

Notes

References

External links
 Official website
 Drake at AllMusic
 
 

Discography
Discographies of Canadian artists
Hip hop discographies
Contemporary R&B discographies
Pop music discographies